Ozan Muharrem Güven (born 19 May 1975) is a Turkish film, TV series and theatre actor. he is best known for playing the role of Rüstem Pasha in the historical television series Muhteşem Yüzyıl.

Biography
His family is of Turkish origin who immigrated from Bulgaria to Germany. He can speak Turkish, German, English. He studied acting at the Izmir Municipal Conservatory and played at the renowned Şahika Tekand Theatre in Istanbul. He also studied Modern Dance at the Mimar Sinan Fine Arts University.
With a remarkable sense of psychology and humour he forcefully performed a wide range of characters in various genres, including drama, crime thriller or satirical comedy. In addition to many TV series and critically successful art films such as Ali Özgentürk's Balalayka or Ümit Ünal's Dokuz (9), Ozan Güven also starred with his friend Cem Yılmaz in the science fiction comedy G.O.R.A, its sequel A.R.O.G as well as in the Western parody Yahşi Batı.
 
In 2005, he married director Türkan Derya. They have one child. They divorced in 2010.

Filmography

Films 
 Arif V 216 (2018), Robot 216
 Annemin Yarası (2016), the lead role of Borislav Miliç (Ozan Güven was also screenplay co-author)
 Pek Yakında (2014), the role of Boğaç Boray
 Ejder Kapanı (2010)
 Yahşi Batı (2010), the role of Lemi Galip
 Anneannem (2010) 
 A.R.O.G. (2008), Taşo
 Anlat İstanbul (Istanbul Tales, 2005)
 Yazı Tura (Toss-Up, 2004)
 G.O.R.A (2004), Robot 216  
 Dokuz (2002), Kaya
 Balalayka (2000), Mehmet
 Yıldız Tepe (2000)

TV series 
 Babil (2020), Egemen Kıvılcım
 Jet Sosyete (2018), Levent Çıkrıkçıoğlu (episode 16)
 Fi (2017–18), Can Manay
 Muhteşem Yüzyıl (2012–14), the role of Damat Rüstem Paşa
 Koyu Kırmızı (2012), Cemil Şenel
 Canım Ailem (2009), Ali
 Hırsız Polis (2005), Kibar Necmi
 Bir İstanbul Masalı (2003), Demir Arhan
 Bana Abi De (2002), Yiğit
 Havada Bulut (2002), Necip
 Aslı ile Kerem (2002), Kerem
 Koçum Benim (2002), Umut
 Dünya Varmış (2001), Çetin
 İkinci Bahar (Second Spring, 1998), Ulaş
 Çiçeği Büyütmek (1998)

Awards 
 Most Promising Young Actor at the 22nd SİYAD (Film Critics Association) Turkish Cinema Awards (for the role of Mehmet in Balalayka).
 Special Jury Award at the 10th ÇASOD (Contemporary Cinema Actors Association) Actor Awards (for one of the roles in Ümit Ünal's film Dokuz; awarded together with Serra Yılmaz, Cezmi Baskın, Ali Poyrazoğlu, Fikret Kuşkan, Rafa Radomisli and Esin Pervane).

References

External links 
 
Ozan Güven Interview May 2013

1975 births
Living people
Actors from Nuremberg
Turkish male film actors
Turkish male stage actors
Turkish male television actors
German male film actors
German male stage actors
German male television actors
German people of Turkish descent